Events in the year 2023 in Benin.

Incumbents 

 President – Patrice Talon
 Vice President – Mariam Chabi Talata
 National Assembly President – Louis Vlavonou
 Foreign Affairs Minister: Aurélien Agbénonci

Events 
Ongoing – COVID-19 pandemic in Benin

 8 January – 2023 Beninese parliamentary election
 Citizens in Benin head to the polls to elect the 109 members of their National Assembly.
29 January – At least 22 people are killed and nearly two dozen are injured after a bus crashes near Dassa-Zoumé, Collines Department.

See also 

 COVID-19 pandemic in Africa

References 

2023 in Benin
2020s in Benin
Years of the 21st century in Benin
Benin
Benin